This is a list of Trinidad and Tobago women writers, including women writers either from or associated with Trinidad and Tobago.

A
 Lisa Allen-Agostini (born 1960s)
 Lauren K. Alleyne (b. 1979)
 Barbara Assoon (1929–2020)

B
 Valerie Belgrave (1946–2016) 
 Dionne Brand (b. 1953)
 Cheryl Byron (c. 1947–2003)

C
 Vahni Capildeo (b. 1973)
 Michèle Pearson Clarke (b. 1973)
 Nicole Craig (b. 1974)

E
 Summer Edward (b. 1986)
 Ramabai Espinet (b. 1948)

G
 R. S. A. Garcia (living)
 Beatrice Greig (b. 1869)
 Rosa Guy (1922–2012)

H
 Merle Hodge (b. 1944)

J
 Barbara Jenkins (living)
 Amryl Johnson (1944–2001)
 Marion Patrick Jones (1931–2016)

M

 Dionyse McTair (b. 1950)
 Emilie Maresse-Paul (1838–1900)
 Marina Ama Omowale Maxwell (living)
 Olga Maynard (1913–1994).
 Shani Mootoo (b. 1957)

N
 Elizabeth Nunez (living)

P
 Ingrid Persaud (living)
 Lakshmi Persaud (living)
 M. NourbeSe Philip (b. 1947)

R
 Jennifer Rahim (living)
 Monique Roffey (b. 1965)

S
 Marina Salandy-Brown (living)
 Frances-Anne Solomon (b. 1966)
 Eintou Pearl Springer (b. 1944)

T
 Samantha Thornhill (living)

W
 Elizabeth Walcott-Hackshaw (b. 1964)
 Maureen Warner-Lewis (b. 1943)

See also
 Trinidad and Tobago literature

References

External links
 "Writers", The Best of Trinidad and Tobago.

Trinidad and Tobago writers
Trinidad and Tobago women writers, List of